Suthar Bhagwandas (born 15 July 1943) is an Indian cricketer. He played in 66 first-class matches for Madhya Pradesh from 1958/59 to 1978/79. In January 1959, at the age of 15 years and 188 days, he became the youngest Indian cricketer to take a five-wicket haul in a first-class match.

See also
 List of Madhya Pradesh cricketers

References

External links
 

1943 births
Living people
Indian cricketers
Madhya Pradesh cricketers
Cricketers from Indore